North Roby is a ghost town in north central Fisher County, Texas, United States, four and one half miles north of Roby.  Its altitude is 1,932 feet (589 m).

Fisher County Airport is in the area.

References

External links

Geography of Fisher County, Texas
Ghost towns in the Texas South Plains